Arazi Hasnal  is a small village in Union council Kuri Dolal near Mandrah in Gujar Khan, Rawalpindi, Punjab, Pakistan. It is located 10 km eastern side of historic Grand Trank Road crossing center of Mandrah town and located on Mandrah Gujar Khan Road passing through Mandhar Village.

Sub-Locality 
Two sub-locality in Village Arazi Hasnal,
 Dhoke Baba Hussain
 Dhoke Natha Rajjgan

Tribes 
Two major tribes in Village Arazi Hasnal,
 Bangial Rajputs (Panwar Rajputs) in Arazi Hasnal
 Minhas Rajputs in Sub localities,

Notable residents 
  Salman Akram Raja Senior Advocate Supreme Court of Pakistan

References 

Therdsak Chaiman

Subahdar#Nazim

Arazi Hasnal

Villages in Gujar Khan Tehsil